Sorlagondi is a village in Nagayalanka mandal of Krishna district in the Indian state of Andhra Pradesh.

References
Villages in Krishna district